Digallic acid is a polyphenolic compound found in Pistacia lentiscus. Digallic acid is also present in the molecule of tannic acid. Digalloyl esters involve either -meta or -para depside bonds.

Tannase is an enzyme that uses digallate to produce gallic acid. This enzyme can also be used to produce digallic acid from gallotannins.

References 

Gallotannins
Trihydroxybenzoic acids
Pyrogallols
Benzoate esters
Vinylogous carboxylic acids